Crocus caspius is a species of flowering plant in the genus Crocus of the family Iridaceae, from Southeastern Transcaucasus to Northern Iran.

Its flowers are white and often stippled lilac on outer petals. the plant has membranous corm tunic splits at base.

The flowering season is October and November.

References

caspius
Plants described in 1838